Ayo Ade Oni was elected Senator for the Ekiti Central constituency of Ekiti State, Nigeria at the start of the Nigerian Fourth Republic, running on the Alliance for Democracy (AD) platform. He took office on 29 May 1999.
After taking his seat in the Senate in June 1999 he was appointed to committees on Aviation, Works & Housing, Transport, State & Local Government and Women Affairs.
In a December 2001 survey of Senators, ThisDay characterized Oni as a "benchwarmer"  a senator who had not been visible on the floor of the Senate or anywhere in the activities of the Senate.

References

Members of the Senate (Nigeria)
Living people
People from Ekiti State
Alliance for Democracy (Nigeria) politicians
Yoruba politicians
20th-century Nigerian politicians
21st-century Nigerian politicians
Year of birth missing (living people)